The Snake's Skin (Das Schlangenhemd) (also referred as The Snake's Slough) is a novel by prominent Georgian writer Grigol Robakidze. It was written and published in the Georgian and German languages.

Background and reception
According to Grigol Robakidze's nephew, Rostom Lominashvili, "During the First World War, Grigol Robakidze was in Iran. It was there that The Snake's Skin took shape". Grigol Robakidze himself states that the idea for The Snake's Skin was generated in Iran: “The idea of The Snake’s Skin came to me in the summer of 1917 in Hamadan…”. In 1926 the novel The Snake’s Skin was published for the first time in Georgian, the language in which it was originally written. In 1928 Grigol Robakidze translated it himself into German, and left for Germany thereafter for its German publication, which included an introduction by Stefan Zweig a prominent Austrian writer of the time.

Prominent Georgian and German writers, literary critics and linguists highly appreciate not only literary part of the novel, but also its language phenomenon (Georgian as well as German) and called Grigol Robakidze a genius writer.

In 2005, Georgian author and researcher Tamar Injia claimed to discover that Grigol Robakdize's The Snake's Skin was extensively plagiarized by Kurban Said in his novel Ali and Nino: A Love Story. Injia's research findings were first published in a series of articles in the Georgian newspaper Our Literature (2003) and later printed as books Grigol Robakidze… Kurban Said – Literary Robbery (2005) in Georgian and Ali and Nino – Literary Robbery! (2009) in English.

The findings of professor Injia were supported and shared by the representatives from various literary circles, scholars and researchers from Georgia and the US: Gia Papuashvili –  documentary movie producer and philologist; Levan Begadze – German linguist, Georgian literary critic and philologist; Zaza Alexidze – former Director of the Georgian National Center of Manuscripts, and discoverer and decipherer of the Caucasian Albanian written script; Betty Blair – researcher of authorship of Ali and Nino: A Love Story and founding editor of Azerbaijan International Magazine.

Plot summary 
The novel The Snake's Skin is about an entire universe, where the space is complete and united. The scene takes place at the entire planet: the West and the East; Russia, Europe and finally Robakidze’s motherland – Georgia. Here one may also find an imaginary world of American billionaire living in his villa at Mediterranean Sea along with various prominent artists.

There is only one tense in The Snake’s Skin – present, but it includes past and future as well. The main thing is reality, but myths and legends are part of this reality. The way of thinking is not only particularly human, but at the same time metaphysical and idealistic.

The personages of the novel do not live in the particular time period, or represent persons with concrete nationality. The author describes a generalized citizen of the world that gets transformed into a particular person or in other words, returns to his roots (actual father, motherland), oneself, and the God. This is an adventure of Archibald Mekeshi’s soul, taking place throughout the centuries.

Further reading
 Avetisian, Violeta. "The Third Shore of Grigol Robakidze and Vladimir Nabokov". Intellectual 16 (2011): 15–23, (in Russian).
 Avetisian, Violeta. "The Chronotope of Nature in the Artistic World of G. Robakidze's The Snake's Skin". Intellectual 17 (2011): 23–28, (in Russian).
 Avetisian, Violeta. "The Chronotope in Grigol Robakidze's Novel The Snake's Skin". Intellectual 18 (2012): 37–46, (in Georgian). 
 Avetisian, Violeta. "The Chronotope of 'Remembrance' in Vladimir Nabokov's Mashenka and in Grigol Robakidze's The Snake's Skin". Publisher: European Narratology Network, November 2013: 1–4, (in English).
 Avetisian, Violeta. "A Dialogue of East and West in Grigol Robakidze's Novel The Snake's Skin". Mermisi, 2013: 93–96, (in Georgian).
 Avetisian, Violeta. "The Concept of Road in the Narrative Space of Grigol Robakidze’s The Snake's Skin". The Kartvelologist 6 (March 2014), (in English and in Georgian).
 Avetisian, Violeta. "The Perception of Time and Space: Crossing the Spatiotemporal Boundaries in Vladimir Nabokov's Mary and in Grigol Robakidze's The Snake's Skin". Consciousness, Literature and the Arts 15, no. 1 (April 2014), (in English).

External links 
Geoliteka (former IM Books Publishing), publisher of “Ali and Nino – Literary Robbery!”
Life and Works of Grigol Robakidze in Georgian
Life and Works of Grigol Robakidze in English
Novel – Goodreads.com

References 

1926 German-language novels
Literature of Georgia (country)
1926 novels
20th-century Georgian novels
Modernist novels
Expressionist works
Existentialist novels
Georgian magic realism novels